Thausgea is a genus of moths of the family Erebidae erected by Pierre Viette in 1966. All the species are found on Madagascar.

Species
Thausgea bekaka Viette, 1966
Thausgea lolo Viette, 1966
Thausgea lucifer Viette, 1966
Thausgea sogai Viette, 1966

References

Calpinae